Elgin Academy may refer to:
 Elgin Academy (Elgin, Illinois) in Elgin, Illinois, USA
 Elgin Academy, Moray in Elgin, Scotland